Evangelical Presbyterian College of Education, Bimbilla is a teacher education college in Bimbilla (Nanumba North District, Northern Region, Ghana). The college is located in Northern Zone zone.
It is one of the about 40 public colleges of education in Ghana. The college participated in the DFID-funded T-TEL programme. The college was established in 1962 with 35 male students. It was a single sex institution until 1975 when females were allowed admission into the school.

History 
The college was founded in 1962 by the Evangelical Presbyterian Church, Ghana, whose headquarters is at Ho in the Volta Region. It was opened on 2 October with 35 male students and remained a single sex institution until 1975 when female students were admitted. It is a Government assisted institution.

Programmes 
The College was established to train four – year Certificate ‘A’ post-middle teachers for basic level schools. It ran the modular course from 1988 to 1992. It turned three – year Certificate ‘A’ post-secondary in 1989. The College ran a three – year Diploma in Basic Education programme and it is one of the colleges selected to train Science and Mathematics teachers. Since April 2005, the College has taken on board the Untrained Teachers Diploma in Basic Education (UTDBE) programme by distance which is a four-year programme.

References 

Christian universities and colleges in Ghana
Colleges of Education in Ghana
Northern Region (Ghana)
Educational institutions established in 1962
1962 establishments in Ghana